Big Band Bossa Nova is a studio album by Enoch Light and His Orchestra. It was released in 1962 on Command Records (catalog no. RS 844-SD). The musicians performing solos included Doc Severinsen on trumpet, Tony Mottola on guitar, Phil Bodner on woodwinds, and Bobby Byrne on trombone.

Big Band Bossa Nova debuted on the Billboard magazine pop album chart on December 22, 1962, peaked at No. 8, and remained on the chart for 29 weeks.

Track listing 
Side A
 "Desafinado" (A.C. Jobim, N. Mendonca) [2:30]
 "One Note Samba" (A.C. Jobim, N. Mendonca) [3:35]
 "Perdido" (Juan Tizol) [3:14]
 "E Luxo So" (A. Barroso, L. Peixoto) [2:53]
 "Galanura" (E. Light, L. Davies) [2:03]
 "Lullaby Of Birdland" (George Shearing) [3:29]

Side B
 "Rio Junction (Bossa Nova)" (E. Light, L. Davies) [2:10]
 "Sem Saudades De Voce" (H. Lyra) [2:34]
 "La Puerta Del Sol" (C. Severinsen, L. Davies) [2:45]
 "Brazil" (Ary Barroso) [2:07]
 "Besame Mucho" (Consuelo Velazquez) [2:46]
 "Take The 'A' Train" (Billy Strayhorn) [2:46]

Credits
 Trumpets: Doc Severinsen, Bernie Glow, Mel Davis, Jimmy Maxwell, Irvin Markowitz
 Drums: Don Lamond
 Woodwinds: Walter Lewinsky, Phil Bodner, Al Klink, Stan Webb, Hank Freeman
 Guitar: Tony Mottola
 Bass: Bob Haggart
 Trombones: Urbie Green, Bobby Byrne, Bob Alexander, Paul Faulise, Jack Satterfield
 Percussion: Bob Rosengarden, Phil Kraus, Eddie Shaughessy

References

Enoch Light albums
1962 albums
Command Records albums